Motorway 7 can refer to:
 M7 motorway (Ireland), a motorway in Ireland
 M7 motorway (Hungary), a motorway in Hungary
 M7 highway (Russia), a highway in Russia, also known as the Volga Highway
 Westlink M7, a motorway in Australia
 Motorway 7 (Greece), a motorway in Greece
 Motorway Route 7 (Thailand), a motorway in Thailand
 Otoyol 7, a motorway in Turkey